Sree Ayyappa Medical College and Research Foundation is a private medical college in Kerala, India. It is run by PSN Educational and Charitable Trust. It has a bed strength of 300. SAMCRF has the most recent medical innovations put to use for the benefit of the community it serves. Currently it is serving its 6th year of clinical activities at Vadasserikkara, Pathanamthitta.

Departments

 Anaesthesiology
 Anatomy
 Biochemistry
 Cardiology
 Cardiothoracic and Vascular Surgery
 Community Medicine
 Dermatology & Venereology
 ENT
 Endocrinology
 Forensic Medicine
 General Surgery
 Internal Medicine
 Microbiology
 Nephrology
 Neurosurgery
 Obstetrics & Gynaecology
 Ophthalmology
 Orthopaedics
 Paediatric Surgery
 Pathology
 Pediatrics
 Pharmaceutical Science
 Pharmacology
 Physical Education
 Physical medicine & Rehabilitation
 Physiology
 Plastic Surgery
 Pulmonary Medicine
 Radiodiagnosis
 Radiotherapy
 TB and Chest Diseases
 Transfusion Medicine & Immunohaematology
 Urology

S.A.M.C.R.F is  a unit of  PSN Educational and Charitable Trust, Nagercoil, Tamilnadu. Established in 2015 and situated in the Western Ghats, it serves the rural population of Pathanamthitta and nearby districts.

Courses offered
Main courses offered include MBBS. SAMCRF envisions to venture soon into post-graduate training in basic specialties (M.D., MS and diploma courses) and super-specialties (DM and MCh), BDS, BSc Nursing and other paramedical courses.

Sister Concerns:
PSN Group of Institutions

See also
 Government Medical College, Thiruvananthapuram
 Government T D Medical College, Alappuzha

Medical colleges in Kerala
Universities and colleges in Pathanamthitta district
Colleges affiliated with the Kerala University of Health Sciences
Educational institutions established in 2017
2017 establishments in Kerala